Archil may refer to:

People
Archil, a historical Georgian male given name (including people with that name)

Georgian Royalty
5th-century Archil of Iberia
8th century prince and martyr Archil of Kakheti 
16th-century Archil, Prince of Mukhrani
17th century King Archil of Imereti
18th century Prince Archil of Imereti

Other
Orcein, a group of lichen-based dyes